This is a list of Dartmouth Big Green players in the NFL Draft.

Key

Selections

Notable undrafted players
Note: No drafts held before 1920

References

Dartmouth

Dartmouth Big Green NFL Draft